Bud Shank Quartet Featuring Claude Williamson is an album by Bud Shank recorded in November 1956 for the Pacific Jazz label.

Track listing
 "A Night in Tunisia" (Dizzy Gillespie, Frank Paparelli) - 4:01
 "Tertia" (Claude Williamson) - 8:31
 "All of You" (Cole Porter) - 6:02
 "Theme" (Williamson) - 3:52 
 "Jive at Five" (Count Basie, Harry Edison) - 4:28
 "Softly, as in a Morning Sunrise" (Oscar Hammerstein II, Sigmund Romberg) - 5:18
 "Polka Dots and Moonbeams" (Jimmy Van Heusen, Johnny Burke) - 3:38
 "The Lamp Is Low" (Peter DeRose, Bert Shefter, Mitchell Parish) - 6:09

Personnel 
Bud Shank - alto saxophone, flute
Claude Williamson - piano, celeste
Don Prell - bass
Chuck Flores - drums

References 

1957 albums
Bud Shank albums
Pacific Jazz Records albums
Albums recorded at Capitol Studios